This is a list in alphabetical order of cricketers who have played for Negombo Cricket Club in first-class matches. Where there is an article, the link comes before the club career span, and the scorecard name (typically initials and surname) comes after. If no article is present, the scorecard name comes before the span.

A
 K. G. Almeida (2022–23)
 S. Ambilmeegama (2013–14)
 Srihan Anuruddhika (2014–15 to 2017–18) : M. W. S. Anuruddhika
 W. S. A. Appuhami (2018–19 to 2019–20)
 S. S. D. Arachchige (2018–19)

B
 R. P. A. K. Baginda (2022)
 Hareen Buddila
 Haren Buddila

C
 Umega Chaturanga (2017–18) : J. U. Chaturanga
 Lasith Croospulle (2017–18 to 2018–19) : D. L. S. Croospulle

D
 Sachin Dalpethado (2017–18) : R. S. C. Dalpethado
 Sandun Dias (2017–18 to 2018–19) : W. M. M. S. Dias
 H. D. P. Dilanka (2017–18)
 J. A. R. Dilshan (2018–19)
 W. A. S. Dilshan (2018–19)
 W. A. D. L. Dulshan (2018–19)
 D. Dushantha (2013–14)

F
 Channa Fernando
 Roshen Fernando
 Sheshan Fernando
 Udith Fernando

 H. U. D. Fernando (2017–18)
 M. C. Fernando (2017–18)
 M. G. P. C. Fernando (2013–14 to 2017–18)
 P. R. N. Fernando (2022)
 P. S. U. Fernando (2019–20 to 2022–23)
 S. S. Fernando (2022 to 2022–23)
 W. A. P. D. Fernando (2013–14 to 2017–18)
 W. P. S. Fernando (2017–18)
 W. R. C. Fernando (2013–14 to 2022–23)
 W. W. A. Fernando (2017–18)

G
 N. T. Gamage (2020–21)

I
 M. A. S. Ifthary (2022)
 N. W. Imeshan (2022 to 2022–23)
 Upul Indrasiri (2018–19 to 2022–23) : S. A. D. U. Indrasiri
 Akeel Inham (2017–18) : A. A. Inham

J
 D. M. Jayalath (2018–19)
 Prasansana Jayamanne (2017–18 to 2018–19): J. M. P. Jayamanne
 A. J. A. Jayasinghe (2018–19 to 2022–23)
 P. Jayasinghe (2013–14)
 G. S. N. Jayasuriya (2018–19)

K
 Ravindra Karunaratne (2017–18 to 2018–19) : M. L. R Karunaratne
 D. S. M. Kumara (2013–14)
 W. A. S. Kumara (2018–19)
 W. U. L. Kurera (2022 to 2022–23)

L
 Graeme Labrooy
 Wendell Labrooy
 R. Lakmal (2013–14 to 2014–15)
 T. P. I. Lakshanka (2019–20 to 2022–23)
 Dilasri Lokubandara (2014–15 to 2022–23) : N. L. S. Lokubandara

M
 Lakshitha Manasinghe
 Mohammad Mohsin

 U. D. P. Madawa (2021–22 to 2022–23)
 M. A. P. Madushan (2022–23)
 L. W. R. Madushanka (2014–15)
 A. L. R. Manasinghe (2019–20 to 2020)
 V. S. R. de Mel (2018–19)
 B. K. E. Milantha (2020–21)
 I. A. P. Milinda (2014–15)
 D. S. P. Millewage (2019–20 to 2022–23)
 Mizanur Rahman (2022 to 2022–23)
 Mohammad Mohsin (2021–22)
 E. M. D. Munaweera (2019–20 to 2022–23)

N
 Saad Nasim

P
 G. P. D. Pathirana (2018–19)
 K. N Peiris (2014–15 to 2022)
 N. W. P. Perera (2018–19)

R
 Laksitha Rasanjana
 Sandaruwan Rodrigo

 C. J. Rajapaksa (2019–20)
 R. M. C. Rajapakshe (2014–15)
 U. S. Rodrigo (2017–18)
 A. K. T. Ruckshan (2017–18)

S
 Danushka Sandaruwan
 Jeewaka Shashen
 Sewvinda Silva

 Saad Nasim (2019–20)
 D. Sanchitha (2020–21)
 H. H. D. Sandaruwan (2022 to 2022–23)
 Jatin S. Saxena (2022 to 2022–23)
 J. Shashen (2021–22 to 2022–23)
 A. S. de Silva (2019–20)
 M. Silva (2014–15)
 M. M. S. Silva (2013–14 to 2017–18)
 P. L. de Silva (2013–14 to 2014–15)
 S. A. D. Silva (2022 to 2022–23)
 W. A. A. Silva (2018–19 to 2022–23)

T
 R. P. Thattil (2019–20 to 2021–22)

W
 Sehan Weerasinghe
 Tharindu Weerasinghe

 M. S. Warnapura (2019–20 to 2021–22)
 R. Wasantha (2014–15)
 Y. S. Weeraratne (2022)
 P. H. B. Weerasingha (2019–20 to 2020)
 K. P. S. Weerasinghe (2017–18)
 T. A. N. Weerasinghe (2017–18)
 W. Wickramasingha (2014–15)
 L. Wickramasinghe (2013–14 to 2014–15)
 Y. A. D. Wickramasinghe (2022)
 M. A. Widanapathirana (2022 to 2022–23)
 I. K. S. Wijesooriya (2013–14)

References

Negombo Cricket Club